Luis Padilla Nervo (19 August 1894 – 9 September 1985) was a Mexican politician and diplomat. He was the first Mexican Ambassador at the United Nations, Minister of Foreign Affairs and President of the Sixth Session of United Nations General Assembly.

Career 
He studied law at the Universidad Nacional Autónoma de México. He also did postgraduate work at American, French, and British universities. Luis Padilla Nervo represented Mexico during the San Francisco Conference in 1945 and signed the United Nations Charter. In addition, he was the first Mexican Ambassador at the United Nations; in that position, he was a member of the United Nations Security Council. During the sixth session, he was president of the United Nations General Assembly.

Padilla Nervo was also ambassador to El Salvador, Paraguay, UNESCO, Costa Rica, and Denmark. In the Mexican public administration, he served in the Ministry of Interior, the Ministry of Education and the Ministry of Labor. At the finish of his commission in the Permanent Mission of Mexico in United Nations, he was elected as judge of the International Court of Justice (ICJ) for the period 1964 to 1973. He became the second Mexican to serve at the ICJ, after Isidro Fabela.

In 1980, he was awarded the Belisario Domínguez Medal of Honor for his contributions "toward the welfare of the Nation and mankind".

Nervo authored one book published in 1985 titled Testimonios de 40 años de presencia de México en las Naciones Unidas.

Books 
Testimonios de 40 años de presencia de México en las Naciones Unidas,

References

External links 
Official web of Mexican Permanent Mission at United Nations (spanish)
Directory of Mexican Permanent Mission at United Nations (spanish)

Mexican Secretaries of Foreign Affairs
Mexican judges
International Court of Justice judges
Permanent Representatives of Mexico to the United Nations
Presidents of the United Nations General Assembly
People from Zamora, Michoacán
Politicians from Michoacán
1894 births
1985 deaths
Grand Crosses 1st class of the Order of Merit of the Federal Republic of Germany
Mexican judges of United Nations courts and tribunals